A gubernatorial election was held on 25 August 2002 to elect the next governor of , a prefecture of Japan located in the north of the Shikoku island.

Candidates 

Takeki Manabe, 62, incumbent since 1998, former public servant. He was supported by the LDP, New Komeito, NCP, and the local chapter of DPJ.
Joji Tatara, 52, magazine editor, supported by the JCP.
Ashufaasako Sasaki, 35, president of a design company.

Results

References 

2002 elections in Japan
Kagawa gubernational elections
Politics of Kagawa Prefecture